Kamal S. Quadir is a Bangladeshi American entrepreneur and artist best known for introducing e-commerce in Bangladesh by founding CellBazaar, an electronic marketplace which, after reaching 4 million users, was acquired by Norwegian telecommunications operator Telenor in 2010. CellBazaar later was rebranded as ekhanei.com. He is the brother of Iqbal Quadir.

Quadir is currently heading the company bKash, which provides financial services through a network of community-based agents and existing technology, including mobile phones. bKash is world's second largest and fastest growing mobile financial services company.

Quadir is a founding member of Open World Initiatives, a Lausanne, Switzerland-based organization of young thinkers. He is involved with Anwarul Quadir Foundation which recognises innovations in developing countries. He is a First Mover Fellow of The Aspen Institute. In 2009, TED selected Quadir a TED Fellow and the World Economic Forum recognised him as a Young Global Leader.

Early life
Quadir was an intern at Insight Venture Partners in New York, led the Business Development Division of Occidental Petroleum's initiative in Bangladesh and worked for New York City's Chamber of Commerce. He was also the co-founder and creative director of GlobeKids Inc., an animation company.

Quadir has completed his BA from Oberlin College and Master of Finance from MIT Sloan School of Management.

He is also an artist whose art works are in the permanent collection of the Bangladesh National Museum and the Liberation War Museum.

Awards
 2005: MIT Ideas Award 
 2007: Tech Award for "Applying Technology to Benefit Humanity" 
 2008: Global Mobile Award of the GSM Association in the category of "Best Use of Mobile for Social & Economic Development" 
 Telecom Asia's "Asian Innovation of the Year" Award 
 India's Manthan Award for "Best E-Content for Development" 
 2009: "Young Global Leader (YGL)" by the World Economic Forum of Davos 
 2015: Schwab Foundation's Social Entrepreneur of the Year 2015
 2016: Oberlin Alumni Awards – Distinguished Achievement Award

See also
 Grameenphone
 Mobile Telecommunications
 Omidyar Network
 Alex Pentland

References

External links
 Anuwarul Quadir Foundation

MIT Sloan School of Management alumni
American people of Bangladeshi descent
Living people
Oberlin College alumni
Mobile telecommunications
American telecommunications industry businesspeople
Year of birth missing (living people)
21st-century Bengalis